Events from the year 1847 in Scotland.

Incumbents

Law officers 
 Lord Advocate – Andrew Rutherfurd
 Solicitor General for Scotland – Thomas Maitland

Judiciary 
 Lord President of the Court of Session and Lord Justice General – Lord Boyle
 Lord Justice Clerk – Lord Hope

Events 
 28 April – the brig Exmouth carrying emigrants from Derry bound for Quebec is wrecked off Islay with only three survivors from more than 250 on board.
 May – The congregations of the United Secession Church unite with most of those of the Relief Church to form the United Presbyterian Church.
 4 May – Glenalmond College opens its doors.
 17 May – Edinburgh, Leith and Newhaven Railway extends through Scotland Street Tunnel to a new southern terminus in Princes Street, Edinburgh.
 17 August – Queen Victoria arrives in HMY Victoria and Albert off Greenock at the start of a visit to Scotland.
 18 September – Educational Institute of Scotland formally constituted as a teachers' union "for the purpose of promoting sound learning and of advancing the interests of education in Scotland".
 4–8 November – James Young Simpson discovers the anaesthetic properties of chloroform and first uses it, successfully, on a patient, in an obstetric case in Edinburgh.
 23 November – the Otago Association ship Philip Laing sets sail from Greenock carrying settlers, mostly from the Free Church of Scotland, bound for Port Chalmers in New Zealand.
 The Ordnance Survey confirms Ben Nevis as the highest mountain in the British Isles, ahead of Ben Macdui.
 Michael Nairn begins manufacture of floorcloth at Kirkcaldy.
 Thomas Guthrie publishes A Plea for Ragged Schools in Edinburgh.

Births 
 29 January – John Ramsay, 13th Earl of Dalhousie, KT, Liberal politician, former Secretary for Scotland (died 1887)
 8 February – Lord Francis Douglas, mountaineer (killed 1865 on the Matterhorn)
 13 February – Sir Robert McAlpine, 1st Baronet, "Concrete Bob", founder of construction firm Sir Robert McAlpine (died 1934)
 3 March – Alexander Graham Bell, scientist and inventor (died 1922 in Nova Scotia)
 28 March – Robert Alan Mowbray Stevenson, art critic (died 1900)
 27 April – Archibald Orr-Ewing, MP (died 1893)
 2 July – Andrew Gray, physicist and mathematician (died 1925)
 28 July – James Lindsay, 26th Earl of Crawford, politician, astronomer and bibliophile (died 1913)
 3 August – John Hamilton-Gordon, 1st Marquess of Aberdeen and Temair, KT, GCMG, GCVO, PC, former Governor General of Canada (died 1934)
 22 August – Alexander Mackenzie, composer (died 1935)
 12 September – John Crichton-Stuart, 3rd Marquess of Bute, KT, landowner and Rector of the University of St Andrews (died 1900)

Deaths 
 23 March –  Archibald Simpson, architect (born 1790)
 31 May – Thomas Chalmers, mathematician and a leader of the Free Church of Scotland (born 1780)
 7 June – David Mushet, metallurgist (born 1772; died in Monmouth)
 9 August – Andrew Combe, physician and phrenologist (born 1797)
 29 August – William Simson, painter best known as a landscapist (born 1798 or 1799; died in London)
 20 November – Henry Francis Lyte, Anglican divine and hymn-writer (born 1793; died in Nice)
 7 December – Robert Liston, pioneering surgeon (born 1794; died in London)

The arts
 R. M. Ballantyne returns to Edinburgh from Canada.
 Charles Lees paints The Golfers.
 The Sobieski Stuarts' fictional Tales of the Century: or Sketches of the romance of history between the years 1746 and 1846 is published.

See also 

Timeline of Scottish history
 1847 in the United Kingdom

References 

 
 Scotland
1840s in Scotland